Stark State College (Stark State) is a public community college in Stark County, Ohio. The college offers 230 majors, options, one-year certificates, and career enhancement certificates. Approximately 4,000 noncredit students are enrolled in continuing education and contract training activities. As of fall 2019, the enrollment was 11,833.

History
Clayton G. Horn, Samuel Krugliak, and Ralph Regula were the leading figures in the founding of Stark State College in 1960. The founding President was Fred A Yenny. The college originally was named Stark County Technical Institute and over the years, renamed Stark State Technical Institute and Stark Technical College. In 1996, the college was renamed Stark State College of Technology and, most recently, renamed as Stark State College.

The college introduced its first new logo in 57 years on January 17, 2017. Stark State called the new logo, "a contemporary image intended to resonate with prospective students, now and into the future."

Locations

Stark State also owns  on the corner of Frank and Mega roads, used primarily for parking. Stark State also offers classes at satellite campuses in Akron, Barberton, and downtown Canton. From 2015 to 2021, the college also operated a satellite center in Alliance.

Stark State College Akron
Stark State College Akron was established in 2017 when SSC began offering classes at a leased facility at 755 White Pond Drive in Akron. A new $15.7 million,  facility opened along Perkins Street adjacent to State Route 8 in 2018, with an additional phase on the third floor completed in mid-2019. The facility, close to the main campus of the University of Akron (UA), enrolls approximately 1,800 students as of 2019. Stark State and UA established the "Direct Connect" dual admission partnership in October 2018 which allows students to enroll at Stark State to complete an associate degree with the intention of transferring to UA to complete a bachelor's degree.

Accreditation
Stark State College is accredited by the Higher Learning Commission. In addition, a number of its specific programs are separately accredited by organizations in their respective fields.

References

External links
 Official website

Education in Stark County, Ohio
Public universities and colleges in Ohio
Buildings and structures in Stark County, Ohio
Community colleges in Ohio
Educational institutions established in 1960
1960 establishments in Ohio